Lotte Olsen (born 23 November 1966) is a retired female badminton player from Denmark, who won a silver medal at the 1993 IBF World Championships and competed at the 1996 Summer Olympics. She won several international tournaments, and four Danish National Badminton Championships in women's doubles during her career.

Lotte Olsen was a leading women's doubles player from her junior year, and won the Danish under-19 championship in 1984 and 1985. She won the silver medal at the 1993 IBF World Championships in women's doubles with Lisbeth Stuer-Lauridsen. They won silver medals at the 1994 European Badminton Championships, where Olsen also won silver medals with Christian Jacobsen in mixed doubles.

Lotte is the older sister of badminton player Rikke Olsen, and together they won the 1995 Hamburg Open in women's doubles. She also competed in badminton at the 1996 Summer Olympics in women's doubles with Ann Jørgensen and in mix with Christian Jakobsen. In women's doubles, she lost in the quarter final to the runners-up from South Korea. She ended her career after the Olympics, and later received the Danish Badminton Federation badge of merit.

References

Living people
1966 births
Danish female badminton players
Olympic badminton players of Denmark
Badminton players at the 1996 Summer Olympics